Alfred Harris (1868–1913), is a fictional character of the British television series, Upstairs, Downstairs. He was portrayed by George Innes.

Plot
Alfred Harris was the original footman at Eaton Place from 1895. He was raised in a religious home and he frequently quotes the Bible, though sometimes inaccurately. He puts on a show of great piety, and often preaches unwanted advice to the other servants. Alfred initially showed romantic interest in the maid Sarah Moffat when she first arrived, but nothing came of it. Later, in 1905, Rose, the head house parlourmaid, discovers Alfred in a sexual situation with an upstairs guest, Baron Klaus von Rimmer. Before the police can arrive to arrest them, Alfred flees Eaton Place with the Baron and becomes his valet.

In 1913, Alfred returns to Eaton Place seeking refuge. He claims to have been sacked by his most recent employer (a Lithuanian man) and is homeless. Rose  is shocked to see him, but she agrees to hide him in a basement room. Later, Rose is horrified to discover that Alfred is actually on the run from the police for murdering his previous employer and (it is implied) lover. Hudson tells Mr Bellamy, who notifies the police. A dramatic standoff results, with Alfred taking the footman Edward hostage in the coal cellar. Alfred is arrested and subsequently hanged for murder, although Rose protests against the sentence, arguing it was not right to do so to a person 'who's not right in the head.'

Controversy
The episode A Suitable Marriage was very controversial. In the episode's time setting, homosexuality was illegal in Britain, and was not decriminalized until 1967. The actors Baron Klaus von Rimmer (Horst Janson) and Alfred Harris (George Innes) also did things in the episode that did not make it to air: "The episode was considered too controversial for American TV (at any time of the day or night), even though in Britain it got an afternoon repeat in 1973. Nevertheless, events in the episode never got to the stage shown in the lower photo, which is presumably the actors messing around!"

See also 
 List of Upstairs, Downstairs (1971 TV series) characters

References

Upstairs, Downstairs characters
Fictional servants
Fiction set in 1907